HMS Vigilant is the third  of the Royal Navy. Vigilant carries the Trident ballistic missile, the United Kingdom's nuclear deterrent.

Construction
Vigilant was built at Barrow-in-Furness by Vickers Shipbuilding and Engineering Ltd (now BAE Systems Submarine Solutions), was launched in October 1995, and commissioned in November 1996.

Letter of last resort
Peter Hennessy visited Vigilant for the Today programme on BBC Radio 4 in 2007. He reported that there is a grey safe in the control room that has an inner safe that only the commanding officer and executive officer can open. In that safe is a letter from the current Prime Minister of the United Kingdom, the letter of last resort, which contains guidance and orders to be followed should the United Kingdom be attacked with nuclear weapons. This letter is identical to the other three letters in similar safes on the other three Vanguard-class submarines carrying the United Kingdom's nuclear deterrent.

Operational history

In 2002, protestors from Trident Ploughshares breached security at Faslane Naval Base where the Vanguard-class submarines are based. Two protestors managed to spray paint Vigilant with the CND symbol and the word "Vile".

Vigilant arrived at Devonport on 11 October 2008 for a major refit. Vigilant returned to the fleet on 27 March 2012 after her £300m refit. In 2013, she test fired her main weapon, a firing of the Trident D5 after three years. Vigilant returned from a patrol on 23 December 2016 before Christmas.

In October 2017, it was revealed that the vessel's captain had been relieved of his command following allegations of an "inappropriate relationship" with a female crew member. Along with the captain, his executive officer was also removed from his post amid allegations of an improper relationship with a different female crew member. Later that month, it was reported that nine crew members had been dismissed for misusing cocaine.

See also
 List of submarines of the Royal Navy
 List of submarine classes of the Royal Navy
 Nuclear weapons and the United Kingdom
 Royal Navy Submarine Service
 Submarine-launched ballistic missile
 Trident nuclear programme

References

External links

 

Vanguard-class submarines
Ships built in Barrow-in-Furness
1995 ships
Submarines of the United Kingdom